The Mac Pasha (from the Turkish title) is a Czech two-place paraglider that was designed by Peter Recek and is produced by Mac Para Technology of Rožnov pod Radhoštěm. It remained in production in 2016 as the Pasha 5.

Design and development
The Pasha was designed as a tandem glider for flight training. The design has progressed through five generations of models, the Pasha, Pasha 2, 3, 4 and 5, each improving on the last. With two sizes, the Pasha 5 models are each named for their approximate wing area in square metres.

Variants
Pasha 2
Tandem glider. The glider model is DHV 1-2 certified.
Pasha 5 39
Smaller-sized model for lighter-weight pilots. The glider model is LTF/EN-B certified.
Pasha 5 42
Larger-sized model for heavier pilots. The glider model is LTF/EN-B certified.

Specifications (Pasha 2)

References

External links

Pasha
Paragliders